Edward Clive may refer to:

Edward Clive (died 1845), Member of Parliament (MP)
Edward Clive (British Army general) (1837–1916), soldier and politician, grandson of the above
Edward Clive, 1st Earl of Powis (1754–1839), British peer and politician
Edward Clive, later known as Edward Herbert, 2nd Earl of Powis (1785–1848), peer
E. E. Clive (1879–1940), British actor
Edward Clive (judge) (1704–1771), British politician and judge